The Night's Gambit is the third solo studio album by American rapper and record producer Kaseem "Ka" Ryan. It was released on July 13, 2013 via Iron Works Records. It was recorded at The End, and produced entirely by Ka himself. The album features sole guest appearance from Roc Marciano.

Critical reception

The Night's Gambit was met with generally favorable reviews from critics. At AnyDecentMusic?, which assigns a normalized rating out of 100 to reviews from mainstream publications, the album received an average score of 79 based on six reviews. The aggregator Album of the Year has the critical consensus of the album at a 82 out of 100, based on seven reviews.

Brandon Soderberg of Spin praised the album, saying that it is "the best example yet of Ka's take-it-or-leave-it rap-auteurist style". RapReviews critic Patrick Taylor stated that it is "an excellent album, and one of the best manifestations of grimey New York hip-hop". Nate Patrin of Pitchfork admired that "as a rapper/producer, he [Ka] has that finely-tuned awareness of how a track works from every angle". Rolling Stone reporter Jonah Weiner said, "Over the hypnotic, self-produced drones of his third solo album, Ka is an auteur with a hushed delivery worthy of Nineties stalwarts like Raekwon and Prodigy". Marshall Gu of PopMatters said, "the album's brevity -- clocking just under 40 minutes -- and his penchant for bookending each song with samples are both welcome blessings".

Accolades

Track listing

Personnel
Kaseem "Ka" Ryan – main artist, producer
Rahkeim Calief Meyer – featured artist (track 6)
Chris Pummill – engineering
Christos Tsantilis – mixing & mastering
Mark Shaw – design & photography

References

External links

2013 albums
Ka (rapper) albums